Găineşti may refer to several villages in Romania:

 Găineşti, a village in Slatina Commune, Suceava County
 Găineşti, a village in Făurești Commune, Vâlcea County